Floribert Songasonga Mwitwa (29 August 1937 – 31 December 2020) was a Democratic Republic of the Congo, Roman Catholic archbishop.

Songasonga Mwitwa was born in 1937 and was ordained to the priesthood in 1963. He served as bishop of the Roman Catholic Diocese of Kolwezi from 1974 to 1998 and as archbishop of the Roman Catholic Archdiocese of Lubumbashi, Democratic Republic of the Congo, from 1998 to 2010.

Notes

1937 births
2020 deaths
20th-century Roman Catholic bishops in the Democratic Republic of the Congo
21st-century Roman Catholic archbishops in Africa
Roman Catholic archbishops of Lubumbashi
Roman Catholic bishops of Kolwezi
21st-century Democratic Republic of the Congo people